Edmonton Tower, is a 29-storey  tall, office building in the Ice District area of Edmonton, Alberta. It opened in mid-December 2016. It is Edmonton's eighth tallest building.

Major tenants
The main tenants announced have been:
City of Edmonton - Floor 3, and floors 5 to 19; Opened with tower.
RBC Dominion Securities - Floors 22 and 23; Opened 2018.

Other tenants
Sorrell Financial - Opened early 2017.

Video display
A large video display, using light-emitting diodes, shows images on the exterior glass of the top four storeys of the tower. The display was installed during construction and first used in January 2017. The building's developer, One Properties, stated that the Oilers Entertainment Group is involved with the project.

See also
List of tallest buildings in Edmonton

References

External links
City of Edmonton: Edmonton Tower
ICE District Properties: Edmonton Tower

Skyscrapers in Edmonton
Skyscraper office buildings in Canada
Ice District
Office buildings completed in 2016